Anthony Joseph Bacala, Jr., known as Tony Bacala (born July 1957), is a law enforcement officer and a Republican member of the Louisiana House of Representatives.

Background

Bacala is married to the former Lisa Faucheux (born July 1962), a Republican who is employed by the Ascension Parish School Board.

House tenure
Bacala voted for and supports an extreme draft Louisiana state bill that would make in vitro fertilization (IVF) treatments and some forms of birth control a crime, and prosecute women who get abortions for "murder." The draft bill intentionally has no exceptions for rape, incest, or the protection of the life of the mother, and would likely also criminalize miscarriages.

References

1957 births
Living people
People from Prairieville, Louisiana
Republican Party members of the Louisiana House of Representatives
East Ascension High School alumni
Louisiana State University alumni
21st-century American politicians
Catholics from Louisiana